The Gáe Bulg (also Gáe Bulga, Gáe Bolg, Gáe Bolga), meaning "spear of mortal pain/death", "gapped/notched spear", or "belly spear", was the name of the spear of Cúchulainn in the Ulster Cycle of Irish mythology. It was given to him by his martial arts teacher, the warrior woman Scáthach, and its technique was taught only to him.

It was made from the bone of a sea monster, the Curruid, that had died while fighting another sea monster, the Coinchenn. Although some sources make it out to be simply a particularly deadly spear, others—notably the Book of Leinster—state that it could only be used under very specialized, ritual conditions:

In other versions of the legend, the spear had seven heads, each with seven barbs. In the Táin Bó Cuailnge, Cúchulainn received the spear after training with the great warrior mistress Scáthach in Alba. She taught him and his foster-brother, Ferdiad, everything the same, except she taught the Gáe Bulg feat only to Cuchulainn. He later used it in single combat against Ferdiad. They were fighting in a ford, and Ferdiad had the upper hand; Cúchulainn's charioteer, Láeg, floated the Gáe Bulg down the stream to his master, who cast it into Ferdiad's body, piercing the warrior's armor and "coursing through the highways and byways of his body so that every single joint filled with barbs." Ferdiad died soon after. On a separate occasion, Cúchulainn also killed his own son, Connla, with the spear. In both instances, it was used as a last resort, as once thrown it proved invariably fatal.

Cúchulainn's use of the Gáe Bulg in the Táin Bó Cuailnge exemplifies its deadliness and the gruesome condition in which it leaves its victims.  This can be seen in the fact that after it is used, one must literally cut into the victim to retrieve it.  This was the case in Cúchulainn's slaying of Ferdiad.  As it is stated in Ciaran Carson's translation of The Táin:

Etymology
Traditionally, the name has been translated as "belly spear", with the second element of the name, bulga, being treated as a derivative of Old Irish bolg "belly, sack, bag".

Several notable Celtic scholars, including Joseph Loth and Kuno Meyer, have preferred to derive it rather from Old Irish bolc "gap, breach, notch" (cognate with Welsh bwlch), suggesting a linguistic link with the second element in the name of Fergus mac Róich's sword, Caladbolg and King Arthur's sword Caledfwlch.

Linguist Eric Hamp derives the second element, bulga, from a Proto-Celtic compound *balu-gaisos meaning "spear of mortal pain/death spear" (comparable to Old Irish fogha "spear, dart", from Proto-Celtic *uo-gaisu-). Once the second element *gaisos "spear" was no longer recognizable to Irish speaker, its Old Irish cognate, gáe, was reattached to the beginning for clarification, forming a new, tautological compound.

See also

 Gungnir, Odin's spear in Nordic legend
 Spear of Lugh, also in Irish myth
 Mythological weapons, for a list

References

Ulster Cycle
Mythological weapons
Spears